Seo Taiji and Boys II is the second studio album by South Korean boy group Seo Taiji and Boys, released via Bando Records on June 21, 1993. With over 2.2 million copies sold, it is one of the best-selling albums in South Korea. The album spawned the hit "Anyhow Song" (Hayeoga) which became its lead single.

Overview
Following the breakout success of their debut album, its followup was highly anticipated. While promoting the second album, Seo Taiji and Boys were banned from appearing on certain television shows, including KBS, because they wore earrings, ripped jeans and had dreadlocks.

Reception
The album was well received in South Korea and continued to build upon the group's popularity, especially amongst teenagers and college students. In November 1993, "Anyhow Song" was deemed the song with the "highest musical perfection" among new generation singers throughout the year. At year-end award shows, Seo Taiji and Boys won the Album Bonsang prize at the 8th Golden Disc Awards in December and was nominated for Album Daesang, but lost to Shin Seung-hun's Because I Love You. In April 1996, Billboard reported that the album had sold over 1.6 million copies, which has since reportedly grown to over 2.2 million copies. In 2007, Kyunghyang Shinmun ranked the album number 30 on its 2007 list of the Top 100 Korean Albums of all time.

Accolades

Track listing
English titles are based on the official translations provided by the Seotaiji Company for international markets. All lyrics are written by Seo Taiji, except track 3; rap written by William Byun.

Personnel
Seo Taiji − vocals, sampling, engineering, guitar on track 2, beat box on track 2, bass on tracks 2, 3, 5, 7 & 8
Yang Hyun-suk − vocals
Lee Juno − vocals
Kim Jong-seo − backing vocals on track 2
Kim Duk-soo − taepyeongso and samul nori on track 2
Lee Tae-sub − guitar on track 2
Ito − guitar on tracks 3−5, 7 & 8
Lee Jeong-sik − saxophone on track 5

References

External links

1993 albums
Seo Taiji and Boys albums